The House of Sverker were a powerful political force in medieval Sweden, contesting for royal power. Their origins were in Östergötland. After the extinction of the House of Stenkil and the ascension of Sverker I of Sweden in 1130, a civil war commenced. In the beginning, there were several pretenders, of whom Sverker I emerged as victorious, for a time. The antagonists in long run were finally the House of Sverker in Östergötland and the House of Eric in Västergötland and Uppland (Saint Eric was killed and buried in the latter province, others in the dynasty were buried in Varnhem Abbey in the former province as later also Birger Jarl was, a relative to the dynasty), which alternated on the throne for several generations, until in the 1220s the Eric dynasty got the upper hand, and the Sverker dynasty became extinct (at least in the male line).

As usual in medieval succession rivalries, the outcome combined the blood of rival lines, as in 1250 Valdemar of the Folkungs (then a minor, his father Birger Jarl acting as regent) ascended the throne, having inherited the Eric dynasty claim from Valdemar's mother (who was sister of Eric XI of Sweden, the last Eric-dynast) and some of the Sverker dynasty claim from Birger's mother (who was daughter of a younger son of Sverker I).

See also
 List of Swedish monarchs
 Norse clans

References

External links

Sverker